Juventus F.C. finished the season second in Serie A. They also reached the semi finals of Coppa Italia and the Cup Winners' Cup. It was the only season without trophies for Giovanni Trapattoni.

Squad

Competitions

Serie A

League table

Matches

Top Scorers
  Roberto Bettega 16
  Franco Causio 4
  Gaetano Scirea 4
  Pietro Fanna 3

Coppa Italia
First round 
bye as defending Champions
Quarterfinals

Semifinals

European Cup Winners' Cup

First Round

Juventus won 3–2 on aggregate.
Second Round

Juventus won 3–1 on aggregate.
Quarterfinals

Juventus won 2–0 on aggregate.
Semifinals

Arsenal won 2–1 on aggregate.

References 

Juventus
Juventus F.C. seasons